The Third Lyons ministry (United Australia–Country Coalition) was the 22nd ministry of the Government of Australia. It was led by the country's 10th Prime Minister, Joseph Lyons. The Third Lyons ministry succeeded the Second Lyons ministry, which dissolved on 9 November 1934 after Lyons entered into a formal Coalition with Earle Page and his Country Party; the second such coalition after that of the Bruce Government. The ministry was replaced by the Fourth Lyons ministry on 29 November 1937 following the 1937 federal election.

Robert Menzies, who died in 1978, was the last surviving member of the Third Lyons ministry; Menzies was also the last surviving member of the Second Lyons ministry. Harold Thorby was the last surviving Country minister.

Ministry

Notes

Ministries of George V
Ministries of Edward VIII
Ministries of George VI
Lyons, 3
1934 establishments in Australia
1937 disestablishments in Australia
Cabinets established in 1934
Cabinets disestablished in 1937